Carl Henrik Jordan Larsson (born 20 June 1997) is a Swedish professional footballer who plays as a forward for Danish club Copenhagen, on loan from the German club Schalke 04, and the Sweden national team. Starting his career with Högaborgs BK in Sweden in the early 2010s, Larsson represented Helsingborgs IF, NEC Nijmegen, and IFK Norrköping before joining Spartak Moscow in 2019. He made his full international debut for the Sweden national team in 2018 and was a squad member at UEFA Euro 2020.

He is the son of former professional footballer and current manager Henrik Larsson.

Club career

Early career
While his father played for FC Barcelona between 2004 and 2006, Larsson played for the team's La Masia academy. He began his senior career at Högaborg in the Swedish Football Division 2, the fourth level of the sport in the country. On 19 June 2013, in a match against Tenhults IF, 15-year-old Larsson played alongside his 41-year-old father, who was making a comeback due to an injury crisis at Högaborg.

Aged 16 in January 2014, Larsson was tracked by another of his father's former employers, Manchester United. Instead, he signed a four-year deal for the city's main club Helsingborgs IF, the same transfer that his father had made 22 years prior.

Helsingborgs IF
Larsson made his first team debut in the Allsvenskan on 27 July 2014, coming on as a substitute for Mattias Lindström in the 73rd minute of a 1–1 home draw against Örebro SK. On 26 August, he made his first start away to Division 2 team Torslanda IK in the second round of the Svenska Cupen, scoring in each half of a 4–1 away win. That November, his father took over as the team's manager, and assured the public that he would not practise nepotism. The following 4 March in the group stage of the competition, Larsson opened a 2–2 draw against Superettan team Syrianska FC with a goal that received attention abroad for the quality of its technique, reminiscent of his father.

Larsson scored his first league goal for Helsingborg on 6 June 2015 in the second minute of a 3–0 win against Åtvidabergs FF, two weeks before his 18th birthday. On 19 July, he added two more in a 3–1 win over AIK at Olympia, and a further two on 20 August in an 8–1 win at fifth-tier Lunden ÖBK in the second round of the cup, which led to interest from IFK Göteborg.

After Helsingborg lost their relegation play-off to Halmstads BK in November 2016, Larsson, who scored a late goal that would have kept them up, was attacked by Hooligans from his own team, who rushed onto the pitch and tore off his shirt. His father subsequently planned to send him on holiday for his protection.

NEC
On 2 January 2017, Larsson transferred from Helsingborg to the Dutch Eredivisie as his father did in 1993, and signed for NEC. He made his debut eleven days later in a 1–0 win at Willem II, replacing Kévin Mayi after 59 minutes. He scored his first goals in Dutch football on 18 August, one in each half of a 3–1 home win over Almere City FC in the first game of the season. NEC finished the season with relegation to the Eerste Divisie via the play-offs.

IFK Norrköping
Larsson returned to the Allsvenskan on 2 January 2018, when he signed a three-year deal with IFK Norrköping. Mainly a substitute in his first season back in the league, he scored just once, in a 3–1 win over Kalmar FF on 15 April. Two weeks later he was sent off as the VitBlå suffered a first home defeat of the season to Trelleborgs FF, for a high challenge on Robin Nilsson. On 23 August, in the second round of the Svenska Cupen, he scored a hat-trick in a 10–0 win at sixth-tier Brottby SK.

In July 2019, in his first European tie, Larsson scored in a 2–1 (4–1 aggregate) win over Ireland's St Patrick's Athletic in the first qualifying round of the UEFA Europa League.

Spartak Moscow
On 2 August 2019, Russian Premier League club FC Spartak Moscow announced the signing of Larsson for around €4 million. 

He scored his first goal for Spartak on 25 August in a game against PFC Krylia Sovetov Samara. On 27 October 2019, he scored twice after coming on as a substitute in the second half in a 3–0 victory over FC Lokomotiv Moscow.

Loan to AIK and release by Spartak
In March 2022, FIFA introduced special regulations related to the Russian invasion of Ukraine. The regulations allow foreign players in Russia to suspend their contracts until the end of the 2021–22 season and sign with a club outside of Russia until that date. On 4 April 2022, Larsson used the new rule to join AIK on a short-term deal, one of the only Spartak players to do so. 

He made his debut for the club six days later in the home premiere against IFK Norrköping. Larsson went straight into the starting eleven and made an assist after 15 minutes when he lifted the ball from a corner to Alexander Milošević who scored the match's only goal. He scored his first goal for the club on 1 May 2022 during an away match against GIF Sundsvall which ended in a 2–0 victory. 

He scored the second goal for the club on 21 May 2022 when AIK played 2–2 against IK Sirius at Friends Arena. The following match, Larsson scored the decisive goal against his old club Helsingborgs IF at Olympia, which AIK won 2–1. He made his last match for the club on June 26, 2022 when he played 61 minutes when AIK played 1–1 against Degerfors IF. During his time at the club, he produced 3 goals and 2 assists in 11 Allsvenskan matches.

On 27 June 2022, Larsson's contract with Spartak was terminated by mutual consent.

Schalke 04
On 5 August 2022, Schalke 04 signed him on a free  transfer until the end of the 2024–25 season.

Loan to Copenhagen
On 28 January 2023, Larsson joined Copenhagen in Denmark on loan for the rest of the 2022–23 season.

International career
On 7 October 2015, in the first game of 2016 UEFA European Under-19 Championship qualification in Sint-Niklaas, Belgium, Larsson assisted and then was assisted by Gustaf Nilsson as Sweden won 2–0 against Belarus. They advanced from the qualifying round but were eliminated in the elite round.

He made his under-21 debut on 3 June 2016, coming on in added time for Arber Zeneli and scoring the winner in a 3–2 victory over Georgia at Rimnersvallen, in qualification for the 2017 European Championship.

Larsson was one of three forwards chosen by coach Håkan Ericson for the team at the 2016 Olympics in Brazil. However, he was withdrawn by his father and club manager, as Helsingborg only had one other striker available.

On 7 January 2018, he made his debut for the senior national team playing 64 minutes in a 1–1 friendly draw with Estonia in Abu Dhabi. Two years and two days later he scored his first international goal, the only one of a friendly win against Moldova in Qatar.

Larsson was called up for a major tournament for the first time when he was included in Sweden's 26-man squad for UEFA Euro 2020.

Personal life
He is the son of Henrik Larsson, who played in the same position for Högaborgs BK, Helsingborgs IF, Feyenoord, Celtic, Barcelona, Manchester United and the Sweden national team. The elder Larsson won trophies in the Netherlands, Scotland, Spain and England, totalling 242 goals for Celtic alone. Larsson was born in Glasgow, days after his dad signed for Celtic. He is named after basketball player Michael Jordan. He has Cape Verdean descent through his paternal grandfather. Larsson was regularly seen at Celtic Park when his father played there, and accompanied him on the pitch in trophy celebrations.

Career statistics

Club

International

Scores and results list Sweden's goal tally first, score column indicates score after each Larsson goal.

Honours
Spartak Moscow
Russian Cup: 2021–22

References

External links

1997 births
Living people
Sportspeople from Helsingborg
People with acquired Swedish citizenship
Footballers from Rotterdam
Swedish footballers
Sweden youth international footballers
Sweden under-21 international footballers
Sweden international footballers
Dutch footballers
Swedish people of Cape Verdean descent
Swedish sportspeople of African descent
Dutch people of Swedish descent
Dutch sportspeople of Cape Verdean descent
Allsvenskan players
Division 2 (Swedish football) players
Association football forwards
Högaborgs BK players
Helsingborgs IF players
NEC Nijmegen players
IFK Norrköping players
FC Spartak Moscow players
AIK Fotboll players
FC Schalke 04 players
F.C. Copenhagen players
Eredivisie players
Footballers from Skåne County
Eerste Divisie players
Russian Premier League players
Bundesliga players
UEFA Euro 2020 players
Swedish expatriate footballers
Expatriate footballers in Russia
Swedish expatriate sportspeople in Russia
Expatriate footballers in Germany
Swedish expatriate sportspeople in Germany
Expatriate footballers in Denmark
Swedish expatriate sportspeople in Denmark